The  is a type of gate seen in Japanese architecture.  It is characterized by the usage of karahafu, an undulating bargeboard peculiar to Japan.  Karamon are often used at the entrances of Japanese castles, Buddhist temples and Shinto shrines, and have historically been a symbol of authority.

History
	
Although kara (唐) can be translated as meaning "China" or "Tang", this type of roof with undulating bargeboards first appeared in Japan during the late Heian period. It was named thus because the word kara was associated by the Japanese with any type of ornate architecture regardless of origin. The karahafu developed during the Heian period and is shown in picture scrolls to decorate gates, corridors, and palanquins. The oldest existing karahafu is found at Hōryū-ji temple.

Initially, the karahafu was used only in temples and aristocratic gateways, but starting from the beginning of the Azuchi–Momoyama period, it became an important architectural element in the construction of a daimyōs mansions and castles.  The karamon entrance was reserved for the shōgun during his onari visits to the retainer, or for the reception of the emperor at shogunate establishments.  A structure associated with these social connections naturally imparted special meaning.

Karamon would later become a means to proclaim the prestige of a building and functioned as a symbol of both religious and secular architecture. In the Tokugawa shogunate, the karamon gates were a powerful symbol of authority reflected in architecture.

Variations

Mukaikaramon

Mukaikaramon (向唐門) is the most common form of karamon, and features two karahafu at the front and back of the gate.  This type of gate may incorporate a karahafu in the middle of the roof, or the entire gable itself may be a curved structure.

Hirakaramon

Hirakaramon (平唐門) are distinguished with two karahafu on the left and right sides of the gate.  This type of gate was originally used at palaces, and was once called miyukimon (御幸門).

Karayotsuashimon

Karayotsuashimon (唐四脚門, "Four-legged gate") is an ornate style of karamon that features four undulating gables on all sides of the gate. A good example of this type of gate can be found at Nikkō Tōshō-gū. This karamon is decorated with 611 sculptures, including the Seven Lucky Gods and the Eight Immortals.

See also
Mon (architecture)
Japanese Buddhist architecture
Buddhist temples in Japan
List of National Treasures of Japan (temples)

Notes

References

Coaldrake, William. (1996). Architecture and Authority in Japan.  London/New York: Routledge. .
Sarvimaki Marja. (2000). Structures, Symbols and Meanings: Chinese and Korean Influence on Japanese Architecture. Helsinki University of Technology, Department of Architecture. .
Sarvimaki Marja. (2003). Layouts and Layers: Spatial Arrangements in Japan and Korea. Sungkyun Journal of East Asian Studies, Volume 3, No. 2.  Retrieved on May 30, 2009.  
Parent, Mary Neighbour. (2003).  Japanese Architecture and Art Net Users System.  

Japanese architectural features
Gates in Japan